Joliet F.C. was an early twentieth century U.S. soccer team sponsored by the Joliet Steel Works of Joliet, Illinois which experienced a brief period of national success between 1915 and 1918.

History
Aside from its role as the Joliet Steel Works company team, little is known of the team’s history.  In 1914, it entered the Association Football League of Chicago.  In 1916, the Chicago and District Association Football League, later known as the Chicago Soccer League, replaced the AFL and Joliet jumped to the new league.  Joliet F.C. won the 1918 Peel Cup, finished runner up to Pullman F.C. in 1915 and went to the semifinals of the 1917 and 1918 National Challenge Cup, losing to Bethlehem Steel both times.

Year-by-year

Honors
Peel Cup
 Winner (1): 1918
 Runner up (1): 1915

League Championship
 Runner Up (1): 1916

References

Defunct soccer clubs in Illinois
Soccer clubs in Chicago